Amanda Minnie Douglas (July 14, 1831 – July 18, 1916) was an American writer of adult and juvenile fiction. She was probably best remembered by young readers of her day for the Little Girl and Helen Grant series published over the decades flanking the turn of the twentieth century.

Early life
Born in New York City, the eldest daughter of John Douglas and Elizabeth Horton was raised in the city of her birth with the exception of several years spent on a farm near Poughkeepsie, New York. She studied art design at the City Institute of New York City for a time before circumstances forced her to fall back on her greater talent as a writer to help support her family. In 1853, Douglas and her family moved from New York City to Newark, New Jersey, where she would remain a resident for the balance of her life.

Career
Douglas began by submitting short stories and poems to local publications. In time her stories appeared in editions of The New York Ledger, Saturday Evening Post and the Lady's Friend Magazine. Her first novel, In Trust, was published in 1866 and sold some 20,000 copies. Learning from this first experience, Douglas made sure to retain the copyrights on all of her future works. She would go on to publish at least a novel a year until her retirement in 1913.
 
A sampling of her works over a near fifty-year career would include: Claudia (1867); Stephen Dane (1867); Sydnie Adriance (1868); With Fate Against Him (1870); Kathie's Stories for Young People (6 vols., 1870-'71); Lucia: Her Problem (1871); Santa Claus Land (1873); Home Nook (1873); The Old Woman who Lived in a Shoe (1874); Seven Daughters (1874); Nelly Kinnard's Kingdom (1876); From Hand to Mouth (1877); Hope Mills (1879); Lost in a Great City (1880); The Heirs of Bradley House (1882); Osborne of Arrochar (1883);  Whom Kathie Married (1883); Floyd Grandon's Honor (1883); Out of the Wreck (1884); Bertha Wray's New Name (1884); A Woman's Inheritance (1885); Foes of Her Household (1886); In the King's Country (1886); The Midnight Marriage; or, A Plot to Gain a Fortune (c. 1890); Floyd Grandon's Honor (1892); In Wild Rose Time (1894); Her Place in the World (1895); Sherburne Series (6 vols., 1895); A Little Girl in Old New York (1897); A Little Girl in Old Boston (1897); A Little Girl in Old Philadelphia (1898); A Little Girl in Old Washington (1899); A Question of Silence (1901); Almost as Good as a Boy (1901); A Little Girl in Old New Orleans (1902); A Little Girl in Old Detroit. (1903); A Little Girl in Old Chicago; A Little Girl in Old San Francisco; Helen Grant's School Days; Helen Grant's Friends (1904); Helen Grant at Aldred House (1905); Helen Grant in College (1906); A Little Girl in Old Quebec (1906); Helen Grant, Senior (1907); Helen Grant, Graduate (1908); Helen Grant, Teacher (1909); and A Little Girl in Old Pittsburg (1909). Her final works, published in 1913, were A Modern Cinderella and The Red House Children at Grafton.

Private life
Douglas cared for Annie, her chronically ill younger sister, for most of her life. She never married. Douglas patented a design of a portable folding mosquito net frame intended for travelers and artists, and had helped others perfect their inventions. Douglas was a friend of Louisa May Alcott and an acquaintance of Edgar Allan Poe. She was an active member of the Ray Palmer Club, a Newark woman's literary group, and the New Jersey Women's Press Club.

Death
Douglas died four days past her 85th birthday at her Newark residence on Summer Avenue. Her funeral services were held at St. James Episcopal Church in Newark and her remains interred beside her sister in Mt. Pleasant Cemetery.

Works 
The dates following the titles are publication and/or copyright dates.

The Kathie Stories
Kathie's Three Wishes, 1873, 1883, 1898
Kathie's Aunt Ruth, 1871, 1873, 1883
Kathie's Summer at Cedarwood, 1898
Kathie's Soldiers, 1871, 1877, 2015
In the Ranks (AKA Kathie in the Ranks), 1872
Kathie's Harvest Days, 1883, 1889, 2009

Follow up to The Kathie Stories
Whom Kathie Married, 1883, 1911, 2016

Sherburne Series
Sherburne House, 1892, 2015
Lyndell Sherburne, 1893, 2010
Sherburne Cousins, 1894
A Sherburne Romance, 1895
The Mistress of Sherburne, 1896, 2016
The Children at Sherburne House, 1897
Sherburne Girls, 1898, 2016
The Heir of Sherburne, 1899
A Sherburne Inheritance, 1901, 1905
A Sherburne Quest, 1902, 2008
Honor Sherburne, September 1904
In the Sherburne Line, September 1907

A Little Girl Series
A Little Girl in Old New York, 1896, 2016
A Little Girl of Long Ago; Or, Hannah Ann (AKA Hannah Ann: A Sequel to A Little Girl in Old New York), 1897, 1898, 1901, 2008, 2009
A Little Girl in Old Boston, 1898, 2016 (starring Doris)
A Little Girl in Old Philadelphia, 1899 (starring Primrose)
A Little Girl in Old Washington, 1900
A Little Girl in New Orleans, 1901
A Little Girl in Old Detroit, 1902, 2009, 2015
A Little Girl in Old St. Louis, 1903
A Little Girl in Old Chicago, 1904, 2016 (starring Ruth Gaynor)
A Little Girl in Old San Francisco, 1905
A Little Girl in Old Quebec, 1906, 2015
A Little Girl in Old Baltimore, 1907
A Little Girl in Old Salem, 1908, 2015 (starring Cynthia Leveritt)
A Little Girl in Old Pittsburg, 1909 (starring Daffodil)

The Helen Grant Books
Helen Grant's Schooldays, 1903, 2017
Helen Grant's Friends, 1904
Helen Grant at Aldred House, 1905
Helen Grant in College, 1906
Helen Grant, Senior, 1907
Helen Grant, Graduate, 1908
Helen Grant, Teacher, 1909
Helen Grant's Decision, 1910
Helen Grant's Harvest Year, 1911

Little Red House Series
The Children in the Little Old Red House, 1912
The Red House Children at Grafton, 1913
The Red House Children's Vacation, 1914
The Red House Children's Year, 1915
The Red House Children Growing Up, 1916

The Maidenhood Series (various authors)
Seven Daughters, by Amanda Minnie Douglas, 1874, 2015
Our Helen, by Sophie May
The Asbury Twins, by Sophie May
That Queer Girl, by Miss Virginia F. Townsend
Running to Waste, by George M. Baker
Daisy Travers, by Adelaide F. Samuels

White Black and Gold Series (various authors)
Heroes of the Crusades, by Amanda Minnie Douglas, 1889, 1892
Adventures of a China Man, by Jules Verne
Fighting: The Life of Philip H. Sheridan, by Headley
Perseverence Island or the Robinson Crusoe of the Nineteenth Century, by Douglas Frazar
Our Standard-bearer: Olive Optic's Life of Gen. U.S. Grant, by Oliver Optic
Lives of the Presidents: From Washington to Cleveland, by unknown

Altemus' Golden Days Series (various authors)
An Easter Lily, by Amanda Minnie Douglas, 1906
Miss Appolina's Choice, by Ellen Douglas Deland
A Boy Lieutenant, by F.S. Bowley
Polly and the Other Girl, by Sophie Swett
Herm, and I, by Myron B. Gibson
Sam, by M.G. McClelland

Other
Stephen Dane, 1867
Sydnie Adriance: Or, Trying the World, 1867, 1869, 2018
Claudia, 1868
In Trust; or, Dr. Bertrand's Household. A tale, 1868, 1872, 1891
Kept His Trust; or, The Doctor's Household, 1868
With Fate against Him, 1870
Lucia: Her Problem, 1872
Home Nook: Or, The Crown of Duty, 1874, 1893, 1901
The Old Woman Who Lived in a Shoe; Or, There's No Place Like Home, 1874, 1875, 2014, 2018
There's No Place Like Home, 1875
Drifted Asunder; Or, the Tide of Fate, 1876, 2013, 2015
Nelly Kinnard's Kingdom, 1876, 1904
From Hand to Mouth, 1878, 1905
Our Wedding Gifts, 1878
Hope Mills: Or, Between Friend and Sweetheart, 1879, 1880
Lost in a Great City, 1880, 1881, 1908, 2012
Floyd Grandon's Honor, 1883, 2015
Out of the Wreck, 1884, 1885
A Woman's Inheritance, 1885, 2016
Foes of Her Household, 1886, 2016
A Modern Adam and Eve in a Garden, 1888, 1889, 2010
The Fortunes of the Faradays, 1888
Osborne of Arrochar (Arrochan is a typo), 1889, 1890, 2016
Guilty or Not Guilty: A Novel. The Leisure Hour Library. Vol. III. No. 278. February 15, 1890
The Midnight Marriage; or, A Plot to Gain a Fortune, 1890, 1899
The Heirs of Bradley House, 1892
Bethia Wray's New Name, 1893
Larry, 1893
In the King's Country, 1894, 2016
In Wild Rose Time, 1894, 1895, 2015
Her Place in the World, 1897, 2015
Almost as Good as a Boy, 1900, 1901
A Question of Silence, 1901
How Bessie Kept House, 1903
A Little Missionary, by 1904
Clover's Princess, 1904
What Charlie Found to Do, 1906
A Modern Cinderella, 1913, 2013
The Girls at Mount Morris, 1914, 2015

References

External links

 
 
 
 
 
 Works by Amanda Douglas, Amanda M. Douglas, and Amanda Minnie Douglas at Google Books (also note that some works on the Internet Archive link to the same books on Google Books)

1831 births
1916 deaths
19th-century American novelists
American children's writers
Writers from Newark, New Jersey
Writers from New York City
American women children's writers
American women novelists
19th-century American women writers
Burials at Mount Pleasant Cemetery (Newark, New Jersey)
Novelists from New York (state)
Novelists from New Jersey